Storyteller is an upcoming puzzle video game designed by Daniel Benmergui and to be published by Annapurna Interactive. The game is scheduled to be released on March 23, 2023 for Microsoft Windows and Nintendo Switch.

Development

Storyteller has been under development by Argentinian game designer Daniel Benmergui since 2009. An early prototype of the game was awarded the Independent Games Festival's innovation award, the Nuovo, in 2012.

Benmergui spoke of the development hell the game was in a Fuckup Nights presentation in 2020, detailing how he abandoned the game in 2015 after being forced to move home to his mother (and subsequently started working on it again). A limited time demo of the game was released in July 2021.

References

Video games developed in Argentina
Upcoming video games scheduled for 2023
Windows games
Indie video games
Puzzle video games
Single-player video games
Annapurna Interactive games
Independent Games Festival winners